For Phineas is an album by pianists Harold Mabern and Geoff Keezer. It was recorded in 1995 and released by Sackville Records.

Recording and music
The music was recorded in January 1995, in concert at the Montréal Bistro, Toronto. The two musicians are pianists Harold Mabern and Geoff Keezer. The album is dedicated to another piano player – Phineas Newborn Jr.

Release and reception

The album was released by Sackville Records. The AllMusic reviewer described it as "A swinging high-quality set within the modern mainstream." The Penguin Guide to Jazz commented that, "The pianos don't always chime comfortably, unless it's a recording artefact. Otherwise delightful."

Track listing
"For Carl" – 8:49
"Jeannine" – 10:06
"I Get a Kick Out of You" – 4:42
"Jate" – 7:75
"While My Lady Sleeps" – 12:01
"Consummation" – 5:49
"Rakin' & Scrapin'" – 9:07
"Straighten Up & Fly Right" – 6:20

Personnel
Harold Mabern – piano
Geoff Keezer – piano

References

1995 albums
Harold Mabern albums
Sackville Records albums